is a side-scrolling platform game by Hudson Soft originally released for the PC Engine/TurboGrafx-16 in 1992 and later re-released for the Virtual Console service in 2007 and the PlayStation Network in 2011. It is the fourth game in the Adventure Island series, released shortly after Super Adventure Island for the SNES, but before Adventure Island 3 for the NES.

Plot
While Master Higgins and Tina are leaving the church after getting married, a shadowy figure called Baron Bronsky and six of his underlings kidnap Tina and some of the island children. The player controls Higgins through six stages with four areas each (the fourth area being a boss battle) to rescue the children, and then finally defeat Baron Bronsky in his fortress to rescue Tina.

Gameplay
The rules and controls of the game are almost identical to those from the original Adventure Island, aside for the ability to get bonus points for finishing a stage with a skateboard. This time Higgins has a choice of four weapons to pick up from: the standard axe, a boomerang, arrows and fireballs (the last one can only be found inside hidden eggs). In some hidden eggs, a PC Engine controller item can spawn, which when collected gives the player 2000 points.

References

External links

1992 video games
Adventure Island (franchise)
Hudson Soft games
Now Production games
Platform games
PlayStation Network games
Single-player video games
TurboGrafx-16 games
Video games developed in Japan
Video games set on fictional islands
Virtual Console games
Virtual Console games for Wii U